Jordi Hereu i Boher (born 14 June 1965 in Barcelona, Spain) is a politician, member of the PSC. He was the Mayor of Barcelona from 2006 to 2011. He is married, has two children and holds a MBA in business administration from the ESADE Business School.

He studied marketing at the city's ESADE business school and was later involved in intermodal logistics activities for the Port of Barcelona  in which the City Council is one of the major shareholders. He was successively appointed to managing the Districts of Sant Andreu, Les Corts and Gràcia at Barcelona City Council. Jordi Hereu became City Councillor for Security and Transportation in 2003. On 30 August 2006 Hereu was designated as the future Mayor of Barcelona, replacing Joan Clos after the latter was appointed as the Minister for Industry. Jordi Hereu took office on 7 September. Hereu formed a minority government with ICV after the May 2007 elections. In the 2011 elections he lost to Xavier Trias.

In 2012 he left all his political responsibilities to focus on the private sector. He is co-founder of Fledge Barcelona and presides the business hub Barcelona Plataforma Empresarial and IdenCity. He is a founding signatory of the Barcelona manifesto, which since 2018 made Barcelona the first city in the world with a science and technology diplomacy strategy.

References

External links

CityMayors profile

1949 births
Living people
Socialists' Party of Catalonia politicians
Mayors of Barcelona City Council
ESADE alumni